{{Infobox livery company
| name        = Worshipful Company of Founders
| image       = Founders' Hall.jpg
| image_size  = 
| caption     = The current Founders' Hall
| motto       = God, the only Founder"
| location    = Founders' Hall, Number One, Cloth Fair, City of London
| formation   = 
| association = Metal bashers
| precedence  = 33rd
| master      = John Wood CBE
| website     = 
}}

The Worshipful Company of Founders is one of the Livery Companies of the City of London, England. The Founders, or workers in brass and bronze, were incorporated under a Royal Charter in 1614. However, with the development of technology, the ancient craft grew obsolete. Now, the Company exists, along with a majority of Livery Companies, as a charitable foundation. It also supports the foundry industry by awarding research grants and scholarships. 

The Founders' Company ranks thirty-third in the order of precedence of Livery Companies. Its motto is God, The Only Founder''. It had an early association with Saint Clement, having either been named the Fraternity of St Clement, or having had that organization as part of its body.

References

External links
The Founders' Company

Founders
1614 establishments in England